Margarita Mbywangi (born 1962) is a Paraguayan politician and an Aché indigenous leader, who in 2008 was appointed the Minister of Indigenous Affairs in Paraguay. Her main goals have focused on gaining indigenous land rights, protecting Paraguay's forested lands, and improving indigenous peoples' access to potable water, food and health care. Margarita is also a skilled poet and was quoted by BBC as saying "For an Indian the forest represents 'his mother, his life, his present and future'".

On August 18, 2008, Paraguayan President Fernando Lugo named Margarita Mbywangi, a member of the Aché indigenous group of eastern Paraguay, as Minister of Indigenous Affairs, the first indigenous person to hold such a position in Paraguay.

According to various news sources, at the age of four she was captured in the jungle near the Aché community of Chupapou and was sold several times into forced labour to families of hacienda owners. She was sent to school, so she learned to read and write, and in 2008 was completing a high school diploma.

The mother-of-three promised to meet with those who opposed her appointment, and in order to ease their concerns, she said "We are immediately going to help colleagues from different communities who are experiencing a difficult situation due to lack of potable water, food and clothing."

References

1962 births
Living people
Government ministers of Paraguay
Paraguayan people of indigenous peoples descent
Indigenous rights activists
Paraguayan activists
Paraguayan women activists
21st-century Paraguayan women politicians
21st-century Paraguayan politicians